Sumatranus is a genus of snakes belonging to the family Homalopsidae.

The species of this genus are found in Southeastern Asia.

Species
Species:
 Sumatranus albomaculata (Duméril, Bibron & Duméril, 1854)

References

Homalopsidae
Snake genera